Best 20 of the Last 20: The Greatest Hits is a compilation album by Canadian country music artist Charlie Major. It was released on September 10, 2013 via MDM Recordings. The package includes two new songs, "A Night to Remember" and "Friday Nights and You".

Track listing

References

External links

2013 compilation albums
Charlie Major albums
MDM Recordings albums